The 2005 ATP Milan Indoor was a men's tennis tournament played on indoor carpet courts at the PalaLido in Milan, Italy and was part of the International Series of the 2005 ATP Tour. It was the 28th and last edition of the tournament ran from 31 January through 6 February 2005. Fifth-seeded Robin Söderling won the singles title.

Finals

Singles

 Robin Söderling defeated  Radek Štěpánek, 6–3, 6–7(2–7), 7–6(7–5)
 It was Söderling's 1st singles title of the year and the 2nd of his career.

Doubles
 Daniele Bracciali /  Giorgio Galimberti defeated  Arnaud Clément /  Jean-François Bachelot, 6–7(8–10), 7–6(8–6), 6–4

References

External links
 ITF tournament edition details
 Singles draw
 Doubles draw

 
Milan Indoor
Milan Indoor
2005
Milan Indoor
Milan Indoor